The 2019 New Caledonia Super Ligue is the 46th season of the New Caledonia Super Ligue, the top-flight football league in New Caledonia. The season started on 30 March 2019. A.S. Magenta are the defending champions.

Teams
A total of ten teams compete in the league, reduced from the previous season of twelve teams. Thio Sport, Racing de Poindimié, and AGJP were relegated from last season, and were replaced by promoted team Wacaelé.
Hienghène Sport
Horizon Patho
Lössi
Magenta
Mont-Dore
Ne Drehu
Tiga Sport
Trio Kedeigne
Wacaelé
Wetr

League table

Relegation playoff
The four participating teams were:
Trio Kedeigne (Super Ligue 9th place)
Baco (winners of Promotion d'Honneur Nord)
Kunié (winners of Promotion d'Honneur Sud)
Qanono (winners of Championnat des Iles)

The two winners of the relegation playoff matches earned places in the 2020 New Caledonia Super Ligue.

Baco and Kunié were promoted; Trio Kedeigne were relegated.

References

External links
Fédération Calédonienne de Football

New Caledonia Super Ligue seasons
New
2019 in New Caledonian football